The Summer King or Summer King may refer to:

The Summer King (novel), 1999 novel by O. R. Melling
The Summer King (opera), a 2017 opera by Daniel Sonenberg, based on the story of baseball player Josh Gibson 
Summer King, a variant of the Red Astrachan apple cultivar
The Summer King, a 2009 poetry collection by Joanna Preston, winner of the 2010 Mary Gilmore Prize

See also
The Winter King, Frederick V
The Winter King (novel), a 1995 novel by Bernard Cornwell